A favourite was the intimate companion of a ruler or other important person. In post-classical and early-modern Europe, among other times and places, the term was used of individuals delegated significant political power by a ruler. It was especially a phenomenon of the 16th and 17th centuries, when government had become too complex for many hereditary rulers with no great interest in or talent for it, and political institutions were still evolving. From 1600 to 1660 there were particular successions of all-powerful minister-favourites in much of Europe, particularly in Spain, England, France and Sweden.

The term is also sometimes employed by writers who want to avoid terms such as "royal mistress", "friend", "companion", or "lover" (of any gender). Several favourites had sexual relations with the monarch (or the monarch's spouse), but the feelings of the monarch for the favourite ran the gamut from simple faith in the favourite's abilities to various degrees of emotional affection and dependence, and sometimes even encompassed sexual infatuation.

The term has an inbuilt element of disapproval and is defined by the Oxford English Dictionary as "One who stands unduly high in the favour of a prince", citing Shakespeare: "Like favourites/ Made proud by Princes" (Much Ado about Nothing, 3.1.9).

Rises and falls of favourites

Favourites inevitably tended to incur the envy and loathing of the rest of the nobility, and monarchs were sometimes obliged by political pressure to dismiss or execute them; in the Middle Ages nobles often rebelled in order to seize and kill a favourite. Too close a relationship between monarch and favourite was seen as a breach of the natural order and hierarchy of society. Since many favourites had flamboyant "over-reaching" personalities, they often led the way to their own downfall with their rash behaviour. As the opinions of the gentry and bourgeoisie grew in importance, they too often strongly disliked favourites. Dislike from all classes could be especially intense in the case of favourites who were elevated from humble, or at least minor, backgrounds by royal favour. Titles and estates were usually given lavishly to favourites, who were compared to mushrooms because they sprang up suddenly overnight, from a bed of excrement. The King's favourite Piers Gaveston is a "night-grown mushrump" (mushroom) to his enemies in Christopher Marlowe's Edward II.

Their falls could be even more sudden, but after about 1650, executions tended to give way to quiet retirement. Favourites who came from the higher nobility, such as Leicester, Lerma, Olivares, and Oxenstierna, were often less resented and lasted longer. Successful minister-favourites also usually needed networks of their own favourites and relatives to help them carry out the work of government – Richelieu had his "créatures" and Olivares his "hechuras". Oxenstierna and William Cecil, who both died in office, successfully trained their sons to succeed them.

The favourite can often not be easily distinguished from the successful royal administrator, who at the top of the tree certainly needed the favour of the monarch, but the term is generally used of those who first came into contact with the monarch through the social life of the court, rather than the business of politics or administration. Figures like William Cecil and Jean-Baptiste Colbert, whose accelerated rise through the administrative ranks owed much to their personal relations with the monarch, but who did not attempt to behave like grandees of the nobility, were also often successful.  Elizabeth I had Cecil as Secretary of State and later Lord High Treasurer from the time she ascended the throne in 1558 until his death 40 years later. She had more colourful relationships with several courtiers; the most lasting and intimate one was with Robert Dudley, Earl of Leicester, who was also a leading politician. Only in her last decade was the position of the Cecils, father and son, challenged by Robert Devereux, 2nd Earl of Essex, when he fatally attempted a coup against the younger Cecil.

Cardinal Wolsey was one figure who rose through the administrative hierarchy, but then lived extremely ostentatiously, before falling suddenly from power. In the Middle Ages in particular, many royal favourites were promoted in the church, English examples including Saints Dunstan and Thomas Becket; Bishops William Waynflete, Robert Burnell and Walter Reynolds. Cardinal Granvelle, like his father, was a trusted Habsburg minister who lived grandly, but he was not really a favourite, partly because most of his career was spent away from the monarch.

Some favourites came from very humble backgrounds: Archibald Armstrong, jester to James I of England infuriated everyone else at court but managed to retire a wealthy man; unlike Robert Cochrane, a stonemason (probably a senior one, more like an architect than an artisan) who became Earl of Mar before the Scottish nobles revolted against him and hanged him and other low-born favourites of James III of Scotland. Olivier le Daim, the barber of Louis XI, acquired a title and important military commands before he was executed on vague charges brought by nobles shortly after his master died, without the knowledge of the new king. It has been claimed that le Daim's career was the origin of the term, as favori (the French word) first appeared around the time of his death in 1484. Privado in Spanish was older, but was later partly replaced by the term valido; in Spanish, both terms were less derogatory than in French and English.  Spain had a succession of validos during the reigns of Philip II, Philip III, and Philip IV.

Such rises from menial positions became progressively harder as the centuries progressed; one of the last families able to jump the widening chasm between servants and nobility was that of Louis XIV's valet, Alexandre Bontemps, whose descendants, holding the office for a further three generations, married into many great families, even eventually including the extended royal family itself. Queen Victoria's John Brown came much too late; the devotion of the monarch and ability to terrorise her household led to hardly any rise in social or economic position.

Decline
In England, the scope for giving political power to a favourite was reduced by the growing importance of Parliament. After the "mushroom" Buckingham was assassinated by John Felton in 1628, Charles I turned to Thomas Wentworth, 1st Earl of Strafford, who had been a leader of Parliamentary opposition to Buckingham and the King, but had become his supporter after Charles made concessions. Strafford can therefore hardly be called a favourite in the usual sense even though his relationship with Charles became very close. He was also from a well-established family, with powerful relations. After several years in power, Strafford was impeached by a Parliament now very hostile to him. When that process failed, it passed a bill of attainder for his execution without trial, and it put enough pressure on Charles that to his subsequent regret, Charles signed it, and Strafford was executed in 1641. There were later minister-favourites in England, but they knew that the favour of the monarch alone was not sufficient to rule, and most also had careers in Parliament.

In France, the movement was in the opposite direction. On the death of Cardinal Mazarin in 1661, the 23-year-old Louis XIV determined that he would rule himself, and he did not allow the delegation of power to ministers that had marked the previous 40 years. The absolute monarchy pioneered by Cardinal Richelieu, Mazarin's predecessor, was to be led by the monarch himself. Louis had many powerful ministers, notably Jean-Baptiste Colbert, in finances, and François-Michel le Tellier, Marquis de Louvois, the army, but the overall direction was never delegated, and no subsequent French minister ever equalled the power of the two cardinals.

The Spanish Habsburgs were not capable of so much energy, but when Olivares was succeeded by his nephew, Luis Méndez de Haro, the last real valido, the control of government into a single pair of hands had already been weakened.

In literature
Favourites were the subject of much contemporary debate, some of it involving a certain amount of danger for the participants. There were a large number of English plays on the subject, amongst the best known to be Marlowe's Edward II in which Piers Gaveston is a leading character, and Sejanus His Fall (1603), for which Ben Jonson was called before the Privy Council, accused of "Popery and treason", as the play was claimed by his enemies to contain allusions to the contemporary court of James I of England. Sejanus, whose career under Tiberius was vividly described by Tacitus, was the subject of numerous works all around Europe. Shakespeare was more cautious, and with the exceptions of Falstaff, badly disappointed in his hopes of becoming a favourite, and Cardinal Wolsey in Henry VIII, he gives no major parts to favourites.

Francis Bacon, almost a favourite himself, devoted much of his essay On Friendship to the subject, writing as a rising politician under Elizabeth I:
It is a strange thing to observe, how high a rate great kings and monarchs do set upon this fruit of friendship, whereof we speak: So great, as they purchase it, many times, at the hazard of their own safety and greatness. For princes, in regard of the distance of their fortune from that of their subjects and servants, cannot gather this fruit, except (to make themselves capable thereof) they raise some persons to be, as it were, companions and almost equals to themselves, which many times sorteth to inconvenience. The modern languages give unto such persons the name of favourites, or privadoes ... .  And we see plainly that this hath been done, not by weak and passionate princes only, but by the wisest and most politic that ever reigned; who have oftentimes joined to themselves some of their servants; whom both themselves have called friends, and allowed other likewise to call them in the same manner; using the word which is received between private men.

Lord Macaulay wrote in 1844 of George III's old tutor, John Stuart, who became Prime Minister: "He was a favourite, and favourites have always been odious in this country. No mere favourite had been at the head of the government since the dagger of Felton had reached the heart of the Duke of Buckingham".

Study of the subject
In 1974 Jean Bérenger published "Pour une enquête européenne, l’histoire du ministeriat au XVIIe siècle" in Annales, a seminal study on the subject. According to Bérenger, the simultaneous success of minister-favourites in several monarchies of the 17th-century was not coincidental, but reflected some change that was taking place at the time. J.H. Elliott and Laurence Brockliss's work (that resulted in the collection of essays The World of the Favourite), undertaken to explore the matter put forward by Bérenger, became the most important comparative treatment of this subject.

Notable favourites

Biblical figures with many elements of the favourite are David (of Saul) and Joseph (of Pharaoh)
Ji Ru, favourite of Emperor Gaozu of Han China (2nd century BC)
Hong Yu, favourite of Emperor Hui of Han
Sejanus, favourite of Tiberius, who executed him in 31
Kapilar, a Tamil poet and alleged favourite of Vel Pari, died by vatakkiruttal around 125 CE at Kabilar Kundru after his beloved's death
Antinous, favourite of Emperor Hadrian, d. 130
Cleander, freedman favourite of Commodus, who executed him in 190
Basil I the Macedonian, born a peasant, became a favourite of Michael III, who raised him to co-emperor of the Byzantine Empire. Basil later had Michael killed and succeeded as sole emperor, founding the Macedonian dynasty
Ibn Ammar came to the attention of the Muslim ruler of the taifa of Seville through his poetry and skill at chess, but tried to seize part of the kingdom for himself, and was strangled personally by his monarch in 1086
Piers Gaveston, 1st Earl of Cornwall, possibly the lover of Edward II of England, was given high office, including being Regent when Edward went abroad, but was executed after capture by rebels in 1312
Hugh the younger Despenser, also possibly the lover of Edward II, was captured and killed in a rebellion led by Edward's Queen in 1326
Álvaro de Luna executed in 1453 after pressure from the nobility of Castile
Robert Cochrane, favourite of James III of Scotland, taken by a cabal of nobles led by Archibald "Bell the Cat" Douglas, 5th Earl of Angus and hanged along with his confederates from Lauder bridge
Pargalı Ibrahim Pasha, favourite of Suleiman I of the Ottoman Empire, who ordered his execution in 1536, possibly on suspicion of treason
Robert Dudley, 1st Earl of Leicester favourite of Elizabeth I of England for 30 years, rumoured lover and long-term candidate for her hand; also a leading patron and statesman. He was succeeded by his rasher stepson Robert Devereux, 2nd Earl of Essex who was executed in 1601 after an abortive coup
"Les Mignons" ("the Darlings"), a group of favourites of Henry III of France
Francisco Goméz de Sandoval y Rojas, Duke of Lerma, died 1625, the first "valido", a semi-official title for Spanish favourites-ran Spain for 20 years before falling from favour and being replaced by Gaspar de Guzmán y Pimentel, Count-Duke of Olivares who ran Spain for a further 20 years
Charles de Luynes in France, the mignon of Louis XIII, arranged the murder of the Queen Mother's favourite Concino Concini in 1617. Concini owed his favour to his wife's close relationship with Marie de' Medici.
George Villiers, 1st Duke of Buckingham, very influential politically and assassinated in 1628, was favourite to both James I and his son Charles I of England. James, who had been effectively orphaned as a baby, and was possibly homosexual, was very prone to dependency on favourites, although whether sexual activity took place remains unclear. Esmé Stewart, 1st Duke of Lennox, 37 to James' 13 when they met, was forced into exile by opponents, and eventually succeeded by Robert Carr, 1st Earl of Somerset; despite titles and wealth, both ended unhappily.
Axel Oxenstierna ran the government of Sweden, very successfully, for over 40 years until his death in 1654, when his son Eric took over
Henri Coiffier de Ruzé, Marquis of Cinq-Mars in France, executed in 1642 after leading a conspiracy against his rival and patron Cardinal Richelieu, who governed France for 18 years
Cardinal Mazarin, governed France for almost 20 years until his death in 1661; Louis XIV's public decision that he would thenceforward "govern alone" marked the end of the golden age of the favourite
Luís de Vasconcelos e Sousa, 3rd Count of Castelo Melhor, was the favourite of the mentally-unstable Afonso VI of Portugal; notably, he convinced the king that his mother Luisa de Guzmán was out to steal his throne and, as a result, Afonso had her sent to a convent
Corfitz Ulfeldt became son-in-law to Christian IV of Denmark before trying to kill him, and then defecting to Swedish service
Sidney Godolphin, 1st Earl of Godolphin, a transitional figure as a protégé of Charles II of England who also had a successful career in Parliament
Marie-Anne de la Trémoille, princesse des Ursins (died 1722) through force of character enjoyed extraordinary power successively in the courts of France, Spain and the English Jacobite exiles
Constantine Phaulkon, Greek first counsellor of King Narai of Ayutthaya, his influences over the King led to the Siamese revolution of 1688
Sarah Churchill, Duchess of Marlborough, domineering friend of Anne, Queen of Great Britain, eventually supplanted by her cousin Abigail Masham, Baroness Masham
Alexander Menshikov, lifelong best friend of Peter I of Russia, came from the most humble origins and attained enormous power, not least after the Tsar's death, when he was de facto ruler for two years until he was banished to Siberia
Heinrich von Brühl (1700-1763), greedy, venal and ultimately disastrous Prime Minister of the Electorate of Saxony 
Johann Friedrich Struensee in Denmark, the royal doctor, who ran the government of the schizophrenic Christian VII whilst having an affair with the Queen, before being executed in 1772
Heshen, who amassed an enormous fortune during the latter part of the reign of the Qianlong Emperor of Qing China
Grigory Alexandrovich Potemkin (died 1791) was the lover of the Empress Catherine II of Russia for two years, but continued to have enormous power in the government for a further fifteen
Platon Alexandrovich Zubov was the last favourite of the Empress Catherine II of Russia who later took substantial part in the murder of her son and heir
Marie-Louise, princesse de Lamballe (died 1792) was the dear friend of Marie-Antoinette and stayed faithful to her until her death
Gabrielle de Polastron, Duchesse de Polignac (died 1793) was the favourite of the last queen of France, Marie-Antoinette, and one of the few women that King Louis XVI liked and trusted
Manuel de Godoy, whose unpopularity led, along with Napoleon's dynastic ambitions, to the abdication of Charles IV of Spain in 1808, after which Godoy spent over 40 years in exile
Grigori Rasputin, Mystic favourite of the Romanov family of Russia, murdered in 1916
Choi Soon-sil, favourite of Park Geun-hye, former President of South Korea

Mistresses

Margaret Erskine, mistress of James V of Scotland and mother of James Stewart, 1st Earl of Moray
Diane de Poitiers, mistress of Henry II of France
Louise de La Vallière, mistress of Louis XIV of France, succeeded by Madame de Montespan
Madame de Maintenon refused to become the mistress of Louis XIV, and became his second, morganatic wife.
Madame de Pompadour, mistress of Louis XV of France
Madame du Barry, later lover of Louis XV of France, guillotined during the French Revolution

See also

Cardinal-nephew
Hanimefendi

Notes

References
Adams, Simon: Leicester and the Court: Essays in Elizabethan Politics Manchester UP 2002  
J.H. Elliott and LWB Brockliss, eds, The World of the Favourite,1999, Yale UP, 

Royalty
Monarchy
Late modern Europe
Government